ABC News (formerly ABC News 24; also referred to as the ABC News channel) is an Australian 24-hour news channel launched and owned by the Australian Broadcasting Corporation. The channel replaced the former ABC HD channel (which simulcast ABC TV in high definition) and commenced broadcasting as ABC News 24 at 7:30 pm (AEST) on Thursday, 22 July 2010.

The network is a division of the ABC’s News and Current Affairs Department. The majority of the channel's content is produced from the ABC’s Sydney station ABN studios, in Ultimo, Sydney which the public can view being presented from an atrium looking into the news presentation studio. ABC's breakfast television programme, News Breakfast, Afternoon Briefing and the evening programme The World is produced at ABV Southbank, Melbourne (weekdays).

Due to the relaunch of ABC HD on 6 December 2016, the picture format of the ABC News channel was reduced to standard definition.

History 
The ABC announced in January 2010 that it planned to launch a 24-hour news channel. The logo of ABC News 24 was revealed by Freeview in their new promotion on Tuesday 22 June. The official promotional reel for the channel was launched on digital channel 24 between 6 and 8 July.

Speculation about a launch date for the channel took place in the weeks prior to the official announcement. The Daily Telegraph claimed in early July that the channel would be delayed due to technical issues at the ABC's new playout facility, MediaHub, in south west Sydney while other outlets reported that the channel was on track to begin in mid-July.

The ABC announced on 13 July 2010 that the channel would have its first live broadcast on 22 July.

In November 2016, the ABC announced that ABC News 24 and ABC NewsRadio would be rebranded under a unified ABC News brand. The relaunch occurred on 10 April 2017.

Reception 
Since the commencement of regular broadcasting, the reaction to the new news channel has been mixed. A particular concern has been the pressure placed upon the budget and operations of both the news division of the ABC, as well as the broadcaster as a whole, particularly the shifting of funds from other departments like drama, Indigenous, documentary and children's  owing to the decision to launch the channel without additional Government funding, as was the case with the recent launch of the children's channel ABC3 (now named ABC ME).

In Senate Estimates hearings in February 2012, the broadcaster confirmed a $2.5 million shortfall in the budget for its news and current affairs division and imposed a 1.5% cut in newsroom budgets, though denies the link to the channel, instead pointing to recent major news events in the past year such as the Christchurch earthquakes and flooding in Queensland and Victoria. However, Independent Senator Nick Xenophon has blamed the reported $20 million annual cost of the network for cutbacks in ABC TV sports coverage of the SANFL.

However, the network has seen success with high viewership compared to competitor Sky News Australia, with reach exceeding 2 million viewers weekly, tripling that of Sky News.

The channel's highest primetime viewership share was 9.5% during the 2016 Federal election coverage on 2 July 2016.

Programming 

ABC News programming consists of a mix of live news bulletins, time-shifted repeats of existing ABC News and Current Affairs output, live broadcasts from events (such as Parliament Question Time and selected press conferences), documentaries and factual and arts programming. These draw upon the ABC's own resources and those of its 

On weekdays, throughout most of the day, straight news programming is presented from one of the studios in Ultimo. At 7pm (AEST/AEDT), the channel features the topical debate program The Drum, which is also the weekdays' sole non-hard news show. General rolling news continues from 8pm AEST/AEDT (only interrupted from 9:45pm to 11pm by a specialist Asian-focused business bulletin and The World) before ABC News switches to the overnight format at 12:30am AEST/AEDT which features a mix of repeats of the day's programs and (usually live) news content from the partner broadcasters. Live ABC-produced news bulletins air once per hour until 4am AEST/AEDT.

On weekends, except the Weekend Breakfast news block, the channel airs a live news bulletin at the top of almost all hours, which lasts 15 or 30 minutes. Occasionally it is a one-minute headline recap. A live news hour is featured on Sundays at 7pm. ABC News switches to the overnight format at 12:15am AEST/AEDT, without any live newscast until the next morning.

Live newscasters are Joe O'Brien (ABC News Mornings), Ros Childs (midday), Gemma Veness and Kirsten Aiken (Afternoon Briefing), Jeremy Fernandez and Karina Carvalho (ABC News Tonight), Michael Tetlow (weekday editions of ABC Late News/News Overnight), Miriam Corowa (weekends), Mariam Saab (ABC News Weekend and weekend editions of ABC Late News/News Overnight). Specialist and feature programming includes a daily business programme covering the Asia-Pacific region, a topical debate programme entitled The Drum presented by Julia Baird and Ellen Fanning and an international bulletin with Beverley O'Connor entitled The World presented from ABC Melbourne Studio.

News Breakfast and ABC News at Noon
Existing shows News Breakfast and ABC News at Noon are broadcast live on the ABC News channel at the same time as on ABC TV in AEST/AEDT time zones; viewers in the AWST and ACST time zones can choose to watch these programs either live (on the ABC News channel) or on delay in their local time (on ABC TV). In addition, The Business is shown in an earlier timeslot than currently scheduled on ABC TV.

Capital Hill
On 30 September 2010, the ABC announced the first new programme to be shown on the channel titled Capital Hill. The political programme, originally hosted by Chris Uhlmann airs Fridays at 5:30 pm AEST/AEDT and takes a look at the week's political events and news, as well as feature interviews with the key players of politics. It is now broadcast every weekday at 1:00 pm AEST/AEDT and is hosted by Greg Jennett (Monday-Thursday) and Matthew Doran (Friday).

World news

Overnight, the ABC News channel uses "satellite" programming, mainly from BBC World News which mostly uses the main BBC News bulletins, as well as Deutsche Welle news and current affairs bulletins and sometimes using shows such as Impact with Yalda Hakim, Outside Source with Ros Atkins and Global with Matthew Amroliwala. The BBC World News broadcasts come live into the ABC News channel before being broadcast around Australia. About two Al Jazeera English Newshours are also broadcast. However, since 2018, the overnight programming has slowly refocused on rebroadcasts of the channel's daytime live shows like The Drum and The World (on weekdays), and ABC's own live news updates have increasingly carried.

Repeated from ABC TV 

 7.30
 Insiders (live simulcast)
 Offsiders
 Australian Story
 Q&A (live simulcast)
 Four Corners
 Landline
 Big Ideas
 Foreign Correspondent

Criticism 

Along with other rolling news channels, the ABC News channel has been criticised for launching into rolling news coverage for "breaking news" where little new information supports such coverage, and just repeating limited information and footage about an event. Conversely, the ABC News channel has also been criticised for not turning to rolling coverage.

ABC News online 
The ABC News channel can be streamed online at the ABC's website and on YouTube. However, the YouTube stream is made available internationally except for the stream in iView where it is only available in Australia only, and unlike other programming on iView, it is not currently offered as unmetered content by any internet service providers. The ABC News channel stream is available in medium and high bandwidth varieties on the iView site.

News presenters

News 
 News Breakfast with Michael Rowland and Lisa Millar
 ABC News Mornings with Joe O'Brien
 ABC News at Noon with Ros Childs
Afternoon Briefing with Gemma Veness (Mondays and Tuesdays), Kirsten Aiken (Wednesdays to Fridays) and Greg Jennett
 The Business with Kathryn Robinson or Alicia Barry 
 ABC Evening News with Karina Carvalho
 The Drum with Julia Baird and Ellen Fanning
7.30 with Sarah Ferguson
 The World with Beverley O'Connor or Yvonne Yong
ABC Late News with Michael Tetlow

Other 
 Dr. Norman Swan – Tonic
 James Valentine – The Mix
Barrie Cassidy – One Plus One
 Yalda Hakim – BBC World News
 Ros Atkins – BBC World News
 Adnan Nawaz – BBC World News
 Peter Dobbie – Al-Jazeera English (formerly BBC News)

Former presenters 
 Ali Moore – Afternoon Live, 2010
 Chris Uhlmann – Political editor and host of Capital Hill, 2010
 Juanita Phillips – ABC Evening News, 2010–2014
 Lyndal Curtis – Political editor and host of Capital Hill, 2011–2014
 Scott Bevan – Afternoon Live, 2010–2015
 Ticky Fullerton – The Business, 2010–2016
Stan Grant – Matter of Fact, 2018
Jane Hutcheon – One Plus One, 2010–2019

International bureaus

Current 
 there were bureaus in the following cities:
 Bangkok 
 Beijing 
 Beirut 
 Jakarta 
 London 
 New Delhi
 Jerusalem 
 Port Moresby
 Seoul (late 2020) 
 Tokyo 
 Washington, DC

Former 
 Amman 
 Auckland 
 Brussels 
 Hong Kong
 Honiara (sometime in the 1940s)
 Johannesburg
 Hanoi (One of the minor Asian bureaus in the 1990s. Closed due to Bangkok being enhanced as an Asian hub, but was temporarily re-established in 2019 to cover the second United States–North Korea summit.)
 Kabul
 Kuala Lumpur (Operated during the 1960s.)
 Moscow (One of the oldest bureaus in the history of the ABC, operating for 23 years. Closed due to budget cuts.)
 Nairobi 
 New York
 Singapore 
 Toronto

Overseas correspondents 

 Barbara Miller – Washington DC (North America correspondent)
 Nick Dole – London (Europe correspondent)
 Isabella Higgins – (Europe correspondent)
 Steve Cannane – (Europe correspondent)
 Jade MacMillian – (United States correspondent) 
 Bill Birtles – Beijing (China correspondent)
Tom Joyner – Jerusalem (Middle East correspondent)
 Anne Barker – Jakarta (Indonesia correspondent)
 Mazoe Ford – Bangkok (South East Asia correspondent)
 Jake Sturmer – Tokyo (North Asia correspondent)
Carrington Clarke – Seoul (East Asia correspondent)
Natalie Whiting – Port Moresby (Papua New Guinea correspondent)

See also

List of digital television channels in Australia

References

External links 

Australian Broadcasting Corporation television
Commercial-free television networks in Australia
English-language television stations in Australia
24-hour television news channels in Australia
Television channels and stations established in 2010
2010 establishments in Australia
Legislature broadcasters in Australia